Harold Wilford Bidlack (born 1958) is a retired United States Air Force officer and national security aide. He ran unsuccessfully for the United States House of Representatives in Colorado's 5th congressional district as the Democratic nominee in the 2008 election. From 2010 to 2014, Bidlack served as a staffer for US Senator Michael Bennet, focusing primarily on veteran and military issues and casework, and oversaw Bennet's military academy nominations.

Bidlack served over 25 years in the Air Force, including 15 years at the United States Air Force Academy. He retired in 2006 with the rank of lieutenant colonel. During his service in the military Bidlack served in the Clinton administration as Director of Global Environmental Affairs for the National Security Council. He is also noted for his educational presentations in-character as Alexander Hamilton and advocacy of rational skepticism.

Early life and education
Bidlack was born in Michigan in 1958. He attended the University of Michigan, where he was a member of the Air Force Reserve Officer Training Corps (AFROTC). He received his Bachelor of Arts in political science (with a minor in economics) in 1980, his Master of Arts in economics in 1987, and his Ph.D. in political science, with a focus on American national government and environmental security issues in 1996.

Air Force career

Bidlack graduated in 1980 and was commissioned as a second lieutenant.

Bidlack was posted with the LGM-30 Minuteman program at F.E. Warren AFB, Wyoming, serving first in operations and then as a nuclear-missile and weapons-systems commander and instructor. In 1988, he was assigned to the United States Air Force Academy in Colorado Springs, Colorado. Bidlack taught at the Academy for 15 years in the Political Science Department, with posts of Instructor, Associate Professor, Course Director, and Division Chief. His subject areas included the U.S. government and national security; international relations; national security policy; the U.S. judicial system; the Supreme Court; the presidency; the U.S. Congress; environmental politics; and environmental security. Bidlack has particular expertise in public policy, the presidency, the Constitution, and the Founding Fathers. From 2001-2003 Bidlack served as Deputy Director of the Air Force Institute for National Security Studies.

Bidlack also served as an augmentee to the Air Force Security Forces military police officer at the Academy, volunteering on a temporary basis when the Security Forces needed additional personnel to guard the gates. After extensive training, Bidlack was awarded the Security Forces badge, and certified for solo patrol. He ultimately patrolled for over 2000 hours during his final two years of active duty, and was awarded an Air Force Achievement Medal for his SF duty, and was commended in particular for his work as a first responder to major traffic accidents on I-25. Bidlack was also certified by the Colorado State Patrol for DUI detection techniques. He retired in September 2006 with the rank of lieutenant colonel. Following his retirement from the Air Force, the Academy asked Bidlack to return as a civilian professor for the 2007-08 academic year and then again for the 2009-2010 academic year.

In 1997 and 1999, Bidlack served rotations in the Clinton administration. As Director of Global Environmental Policy on the staff of the National Security Council, Bidlack's primary duties were to assist the senior Director in drafting speeches and writing background papers for President Bill Clinton and Vice President Al Gore. He also conducted research for the National Security Advisor. In 2001, Bidlack served in the Bush administration in the Department of State as Deputy Director of Security Programs and Military Advisor. His service there included work with classified nuclear weapons security in the post-Soviet states.

Bidlack was in the Pentagon on the morning of the September 11 attacks and participated in rescue and recovery efforts. He held Top Secret/Sensitive Compartmented Information (TS/SCI) security clearance during his posts in the Clinton and Bush administrations.

2008 congressional candidacy

Bidlack ran for the United States House of Representatives in Colorado's 5th congressional district as a Democrat in the 2008 elections. He was the second Bidlack to run for Congress; his ancestor Benjamin Alden Bidlack, served in the 27th and 28th Congresses in the 1840s.

Bidlack described himself as a very conservative Blue Dog Democrat who told Rocky Mountain News that he had voted for a number of Republicans, although never a presidential candidate.

The 5th district is largely considered a very "red" (Republican-leaning) district, with a large population of Evangelical Christians centered around Colorado Springs and a Cook Partisan Voting Index of R+16. Despite the tough Republican primary faced by Bidlack's Republican opponent Doug Lamborn, Bidlack was defeated by Lamborn 60.1 percent to 36.9 percent.

Results (459 precincts)
Doug Lamborn (Republican) - 60.1% (178,594)
Hal Bidlack (Democratic) - 36.9% (109,658)
Brian Scott (American Constitution) - 2.8% (8,576)

In 2009, Colorado Governor Bill Ritter named Bidlack as a commissioner to the 4th Judicial District Judicial Performance Commission. In 2010, Bidlack acted as Chair for the Colorado Democratic Party's State Platform Committee. In March 2010, Bidlack was elected Chair of the El Paso County Democratic Party.

Alexander Hamilton performances
Since 1996, Bidlack has appeared before radio and live audiences portraying Alexander Hamilton. He has made presentations throughout the country as Hamilton and has been referred to as "the nation's leading Hamilton theatrical performer," making various performances at schools, universities, museums, and professional associations. He has performed at, among others, the State Library of Ohio, Smithsonian Institution, and the John F. Kennedy Center for the Performing Arts Imagination Celebration. As Hamilton, Bidlack gives spontaneous, unscripted presentations followed by audience questions.

As Hamilton, Bidlack has been covered by C-SPAN and has appeared on The Thomas Jefferson Hour, engaging in a debate with Clay S. Jenkinson portraying Thomas Jefferson. He also appeared as Hamilton in two episodes of the Inventing America series.

Personal life
Bidlack lives in Colorado Springs, where he and his late wife, Martha, raised their three children. Martha Bidlack died of cancer in 2003.

From 2001 until his resignation in 2004, Bidlack was an Administrator for the Forum Board at the James Randi Educational Foundation website, the non-profit skeptics organization. In addition, he was on the JREF Board of Trustees. Bidlack also served on the Board of Directors for the Windstar Foundation in the 1990s. In 2007, he wrote an open letter to talk show host Montel Williams (a fellow retired military officer), criticizing him for featuring Sylvia Browne on The Montel Williams Show.

In March 2010, Bidlack remarried. His wife, Dana Cole, served as his finance director during his congressional campaign, and after the election, they began dating.

Bidlack's hobbies are fitness and road cycling.

In a July 11, 2010 JREF Million Dollar Demonstration, TAM8 "claimant" Anita Ikonen was asked to view 5 persons to determine which is missing a kidney. Hal Bidlack #2 was the target, but Ikonen failed the demonstration by picking #3 Derek Colanduno.

References

External links
Official campaign website
Hamilton Lives - Bidlack's official Alexander Hamilton website
Interview with Hal Bidlack at the 2007 James Randi Educational Foundation Amazing Meeting by the podcast Skepticality
Interview with Hal Bidlack on "Being A Skeptic of Faith," broadcast on the podcast Skepticality on July 24, 2007

American political candidates
American skeptics
University of Michigan alumni
1958 births
Living people
Colorado Democrats